Pacheco is a surname. It may also refer to the following:

Pacheco, California, United States, a census-designated place
Pacheco, former name of Ignacio, California, an unincorporated community
Pacheco Pass, California, a mountain pass
Pacheco State Park, California
Pacheco Island, in Chile
General Pacheco, in Argentina
Pacheco Creek (disambiguation)
Pacheco Creek (Contra Costa County), a tributary of Suisun Bay
Pacheco Creek (San Benito County), a tributary of the Pajaro River, in San Benito County, California.
South Fork Pacheco Creek, a tributary stream of Pacheco Creek (San Benito County)
East Fork Pacheco Creek, a tributary stream of Pacheco Creek (San Benito County)
North Fork Pacheco Creek, a tributary stream of Pacheco Creek (San Benito County)
Pacheco Reservoir, California, a reservoir formed by a dam on the north fork of Pacheco Creek (San Benito County) a.k.a. "North Fork Dam"

People

Pacheco (1921-1996) - Joaquín Monserrat, Spanish-Puerto Rican children's television show host
Bruno Pacheco (born 1970) - Peruvian politician
Bruno Pacheco (born 1991) - Brazilian footballer

In Spanish, Pacheco is a surname, which could be literally  translated to "Noble One".

See also
25001 Pacheco, a main-belt asteroid